During the 1994–95 English football season, Portsmouth F.C. competed in the Football League First Division.

Season summary
The 1994–95 season was a disappointing one for Pompey and after a decline in form which left them struggling at the wrong end of Division One, Smith was sacked in February 1995 and was replaced by Terry Fenwick, who guided them to safety with 4 wins in their final 6 league games.

Final league table

Results
Portsmouth's score comes first

Legend

Football League First Division

FA Cup

League Cup

Squad

References

Portsmouth F.C. seasons
Portsmouth